= Nangal Jamalpur =

- Village
- Location in Punjab, India Nangal Jamalpur (India)
- Coordinates: 31.3606926°N 75.6003155°E
- Country: India
- State: Punjab
- District: Jalandhar
- Tehsil: Jalandhar - I

Government
  - Type: Panchayat raj
  - Body: Gram panchayat

Area
  - Total: 39 ha (96 acres)

Population (2011)
  - Total: 532; 295/237 ♂/♀
  - Scheduled Castes: 319; 173/146 ♂/♀
  - Total Households: 115

Languages
  - Official: Punjabi
- Time zone: UTC+5:30 (IST)
- ISO 3166 code: IN-PB
- Vehicle registration: PB-08
- Website: jalandhar.gov.in

Nangal Jamalpur is a village in Jalandhar - I in Jalandhar district of Punjab State, India. It is located 4 kilometres (2.5 mi) from district headquarter. The village is administrated by Sarpanch an elected representative of the village.

== Demography ==
As of 2011, the village has 115 houses and a population of 532 of which 295 are males and 237 are females. According to the report published by Census India in 2011, of the village population, 319 people are from Schedule Caste and the village does not have any Scheduled Tribe population.

== See also ==
- List of villages in India
